is a network of toll expressways in the Greater Tokyo Area of Japan.

Most routes are grade-separated (elevated roads or tunnels) and central routes have many sharp curves and multi-lane merges that require caution to drive safely. The speed limit is 60 km/h on most routes, but 80 km/h on the Bayshore Route, and 50 km/h on the Inner Circular Route.

All trips on the expressway require a toll be paid. As of 2014, the cash toll for a standard-size car is ¥1300 regardless of distance traveled. Vehicles using the ETC toll-collection system pay a distance-based toll ranging from ¥300 to ¥1300 for ordinary vehicles (see toll price) – in some cases substantially less than the previous fixed-rate toll. Lower cash rates exist for certain radial routes (where there are only a few kilometers of expressway remaining) and ETC users have various time-of-day discounts. For large vehicles, the toll is doubled.

Routes 
There are 24 routes currently in operation:

Circular (loop) routes
C1 Inner Circular Route
C2 Central Circular Route — loop incorporating the Yamate Tunnel. 
Y Yaesu Route — via Tokyo Expressway

Bayshore route
B Bayshore Route (Higashi-Kanto-Expressway – ) Chidori-cho – Sachiura / Namiki ( – Yokohama–Yokosuka Expressway)

Radial routes
No. 1 Ueno Route Edobashi JCT – Iriya
No. 1 Haneda Route Hamazakibashi JCT – Haneda ( – Route K1)
No. 2 Meguro Route Ichinohashi JCT – Togoshi
No. 3 Shibuya Route Tanimachi JCT – Yoga ( – the Tomei Expressway)
No. 4 Shinjuku Route Miyakezaka JCT – Takaido ( – the Chuo Expressway)
No. 5 Ikebukuro Route Takebashi JCT – Bijogi JCT ( – Route S5)
No. 6 Mukojima Route Edobashi JCT – Horikiri JCT ( – Route C2)
No. 6 Misato Route Kosuge JCT – Misato JCT ( – Tokyo Gaikan Expressway)
No. 7 Komatsugawa Route Ryogoku JCT – Ichinoe ( – Keiyo Road)
No. 9 Fukagawa Route Hakozaki JCT – Tatsumi JCT ( – Bayshore Route)
No. 10 Harumi Route Ariake JCT – Harumi
No. 11 Daiba Route Shibaura JCT – Ariake JCT (Tokyo Rainbow Bridge)
S1 Kawaguchi Route (Route C2 – ) Kohoku JCT – Kawaguchi JCT ( – Tokyo Gaikan Expressway)

Kanagawa routes
K1 Yokohane Route (Route 1 – ) Haneda - Ishikawa-cho JCT ( – Route K3)
K2 Mitsuzawa Route Kinko JCT – Mitsuzawa ( – Yokohama Shindo Road and Daisan Keihin Road)
K3 Kariba Route Honmoku JCT – Kariba ( – Yokohama Shindo Road and Yokohama-Yokosuka Expressway)
K5 Daikoku Route (Route K1 – ) Namamugi JCT - Daikoku JCT ( – Bayshore Route)
K6 Kawasaki Route Tonomachi – Kawasaki-Ukishima JCT ( – Bayshore Route and Tokyo Bay Aqua Line)
K7 Yokohama North Route (Route K1 and Route K5 – ) Namamugi JCT - Yokohama Kōhoku JCT ( – Daisan Keihin Road and Route K7)
K7 Yokohama Northwest Route (Route K7 and Daisan Keihin Road – ) Yokohama Kōhoku JCT – Yokohama-Aoba JCT ( – Tōmei Expressway)

Saitama routes
S2 Saitama Shintoshin Route (Route S5) Yono – Saitama-Minuma
S5 Ōmiya Route (Route 5 – ) Bijogi JCT – Yono ( – Route S2)

History

The Metropolitan Expressway was first built between Kyobashi Exit in Chūō, Tokyo and Shibaura Exit in Minato, Tokyo in 1962 for the purpose of increasing traffic flow efficiency in the Tokyo Metropolitan Area, thus optimizing and improving the functionality of the traffic system. Since then, 280 kilometers of highway network has been built in the Tokyo metropolitan area; 30 kilometers more of highway are either constructed or planned, making the Metropolitan Expressway a vast network of urban expressways in the Tokyo region.

Pillion passenger ban on motorcycles
Japan allows a person aged at least 20 who has held a motorcycle driver's license for at least three years to carry a pillion passenger on expressways, however, the Shuto Expressway in the central parts of Tokyo prohibit carrying pillion passengers due to poor road geometry. The ban does not apply if the motorcycle is equipped with a sidecar. The segments with a pillion ban include the important C1 Inner Circular route and adjoining central Tokyo routes.

With the opening of the C2 Yamate Tunnel, motorcycles with a pillion passengers can finally pass through the Shuto Expressway from the national expressways such as Tōmei Expressway to other expressways using the C2 route, although this can be a much longer drive in some cases.

Parking areas
There are 21 parking areas scattered throughout the Shuto Expressway system. In general these are much smaller than the service areas available every  or so on inter-city expressways. In some cases there are no more than toilets, a few vending machines, and a handful of parking spaces. None have fuel – drivers must exit the system (and pay the toll again on re-entry) to use a service station.

Street racing
Like other expressways in Japan including the Tōmei Expressway, the Shuto line has become a common street racing road. One of the lines, the Bayshore Route (also known as the Wangan route), received worldwide notoriety during the 1990s as the home course for the Mid Night Club, one of the most notorious street racing clubs, who were known for their 300 km/h, sometimes 320 km/h exploits.

Due to this infamy, the Wangan is the setting for several entertainment properties, such as the manga and arcade game Wangan Midnight, video games Shutokou Battle and Gran Turismo 5, 6, Sport and 7 (as the street circuit) and the movie series Shuto Kousoku Trial. Numerous car enthusiast magazines and DVDs, like Best Motoring, also highlight races and activities on the Wangan.

See also 
 Expressways of Japan
 Japan Highway Public Corporation
 Wangan Midnight

References

External links
 Official website

 
Expressways in Japan
Transport companies established in 1959
Transport companies based in Tokyo
1959 establishments in Japan